The Austrian Litigation Association of NGOs against discrimination is an umbrella organisation of 13 (March 2009) organisations committed to combatting discrimination on the grounds of sex/gender, ethnic origin, religion and belief, disability, sexual orientation and age. It seems unique that organisations dealing with all grounds participate.
The organisation is not profit-minded but strives to implement the rights of those who suffer discrimination. Additionally, the recognition of the role of NGOs to the further development of the legislation and judicial practice concerning discrimination should be promoted and enforced in the public.

The main work of the Litigation Association is to consult its members and the clients of those NGOs as well as to send advisory experts to the Commission on Equal Treatment.

Thanks to § 62 of the Equal Treatment Act (GlBG) which provides for the possibility to intervene in favour of plaintiffs, the Klagsverband attends victims of indirect or direct discrimination in the litigation. This additional legal protection exists with regard to discrimination at work as well as in other situation like the access to services and goods (housing, access to restaurants and clubs, travel, …).

Finally, the Klagsverband is part of a wide network of organisations and provides these contacts to victims of discrimination.
These organisations are (October 2010; in alphabetical order):

•BIZEPS - Zentrum für Selbstbestimmtes Leben
•dabei - dachverband berufliche integration Austria
•FRAUENSERVICE Graz
•Helping Hands Graz
•Homosexuelle Initiative Wien (HOSI Wien)
•ISOP - Innovative Sozialprojekte
•LEFÖ - Beratung, Bildung und Begleitung für Migrantinnen
•Ludwig Boltzmann Institut für Menschenrechte - Forschungsverein (BIM-FV)
•maiz - Autonomes Zentrum von und für Migrantinnen
•Österreichischer Gehörlosenbund (ÖGLB)
•Plattform Menschenrechte Salzburg
•Rechtskomitee Lambda
•Reiz - Selbstbestimmt Leben
•Selbstbestimmt Leben Innsbruck
•Selbstbestimmt-Leben-Initiative Oberösterreich
•SOMM - Selbstorganisation von und für Migrantinnen und Musliminnen
•SOPHIE - Bildungsraum für Prostituierte
•TransX - Verein für TransGender Personen
•Verein österreichischer Juristinnen

References

External links

•ZARA - Zivilcourage und Anti-Rassismus-Arbeit

Political organisations based in Austria